"I Will Be Home Again" is a song written by Bennie Benjamin, Raymond Leveen, and Lou Singer, in 1944.

The Golden Gate Quartet recorded the song on March 16, 1945.  This version was released on Okeh Records #6741.

Elvis Presley also recorded this song. It was released on the album Elvis Is Back!. It was the first song that Elvis' army buddy, Charlie Hodge, sang harmony with Elvis.

References

Elvis Presley songs
Songs written by Bennie Benjamin
Songs with music by Lou Singer
1944 songs
Songs with lyrics by Raymond Leveen
Okeh Records singles